Eliza Roxcy Snow (January 21, 1804 – December 5, 1887) was one of the most celebrated Latter Day Saint women of the nineteenth century. A renowned poet, she chronicled history, celebrated nature and relationships, and expounded scripture and doctrine. Snow was married to Joseph Smith as a plural wife and was openly a plural wife of Brigham Young after Smith's death. Snow was the second general president of the Relief Society of the Church of Jesus Christ of Latter-day Saints (LDS Church), which she reestablished in Utah Territory in 1866.  She was also the sister of Lorenzo Snow, the church's fifth president.

Early years and education
Born in Becket, Massachusetts, Eliza Roxcy Snow was the second of seven children, four daughters and three sons, of Oliver and Rosetta Snow. Her parents were of English descent; their ancestors were among the earliest settlers of New England. When she was two years old, her family left New England to settle on a new and fertile farm in the Western Reserve valley, in Mantua Township, Portage County, Ohio. The Snow family valued learning and saw that each child had educational opportunities.

Although a farmer by occupation, Oliver Snow performed much public business, officiating in several responsible positions. His daughter Eliza, being ten years the senior of her eldest brother, was employed as secretary, as soon as she was competent, in her father's office as justice of the peace. She was skilled in various kinds of needlework and home manufactures. Two years in succession she drew the prize awarded by the committee on manufactures, at the county fair, for the best manufactured leghorn.

Early church involvement

Snow's Baptist parents welcomed a variety of religious believers into their home. In 1828, Snow and her parents joined Alexander Campbell's Christian restorationist movement, the Disciples of Christ. In 1831, when Joseph Smith, founder of the Latter Day Saint movement, took up residence in Hiram, Ohio, four miles from the family's farm, the Snow family took a strong interest in the new religious movement. Snow's mother and sister joined Church of the Latter Day Saints early on; several years later, in 1835, Snow was baptized and moved to Kirtland, Ohio, the headquarters of the church. Upon her arrival, Snow donated her inheritance, a large sum of money, toward the building of the church's Kirtland Temple. In appreciation, the building committee provided her with the title to "a very valuable [lot]-situated near the Temple, with a fruit tree-an excellent spring of water, and house that accommodated two families." Here, Snow taught school for Smith's family and was influential in interesting her younger brother, Lorenzo, in Mormonism. Lorenzo Snow later became an apostle and the church's fifth president.

Snow moved west with her family and the body of the church, first to Adam-ondi-Ahman, a short-lived settlement in Missouri, and then to Nauvoo, Illinois. In the 1930s, Alice Merrill Horne wrote in her autobiography that when she was a girl she overheard a conversation that in Missouri during the 1838 Mormon War, Eliza Snow was brutally gang-raped by eight Missourians, which left her unable to have children. Later, according to Alice Merrill Horne, Joseph Smith offered her marriage as a plural wife "as a way of promising her that she would still have eternal offspring and that she would be a mother in Zion."

In Nauvoo, Snow again made her living as a school teacher. After Smith's death, Snow claimed to have secretly wed him on June 29, 1842, as a plural wife. Snow wrote fondly of Smith, "my beloved husband, the choice of my heart and the crown of my life". However, Snow had organized a petition in that same summer of 1842, with a thousand female signatures, denying that Smith was connected with polygamy and extolling his virtue. As Secretary of the Ladies' Relief Society, she organized the publishing of a certificate in October 1842 denouncing polygamy and denying Smith as its creator or participant. Years later, when Snow was informed that Smith's first wife, Emma, had stated on her deathbed that her husband had never been a polygamist, Snow was reported to have stated she doubted the story but "If ... [this] was really [Sister Emma's] testimony she died with a libel on her lips".

After Smith's death, Snow married Brigham Young as a plural wife. She traveled west across the plains and arrived in the Salt Lake Valley on October 2, 1847. There, childless Eliza became a prominent member of Young's family, moving into an upper bedroom in Young's Salt Lake City residence, the Lion House.

Relief Society service 

The first Relief Society of the LDS Church was organized by Joseph Smith in Nauvoo, Illinois on March 17, 1842, as a philanthropic and women's educational organization. Snow served as the organization's first secretary, with Smith's wife, Emma, as president. The organization was originally known as "The Female Relief Society of Nauvoo." It later became known simply as "The Relief Society." For the next three years, Snow kept copious notes of the organization's meetings, including Joseph Smith's teachings on how the organization should operate. Members of the original Relief Society stopped meeting shortly after Smith's death in 1844, and the organization soon became defunct.

Brigham Young led a migration of LDS Church members to the Salt Lake Valley in 1847, and for the next twenty years attempts were periodically made to reestablish the organization. Until 1868, however, activity was limited, and no sustained, church-wide Relief Society existed.

In 1868, Young commissioned Snow with reestablishing the Relief Society. For the next several years, Snow traveled throughout the Utah Territory helping LDS bishops organize Relief Societies in their local wards, using the notes she took as secretary in Nauvoo as the founding principles of the reestablished Relief Society. "What is the object of the Female Relief Society?" Snow wrote on one occasion. "I would reply—to do good—to bring into requisition every capacity we possess for doing good, not only in relieving the poor but in saving souls." Local Relief Societies soon fell under the umbrella of a church-wide, general Relief Society of which Snow served as president until 1887.

Snow's presidency emphasized spirituality and self-sufficiency. The Relief Society sent women to medical school, trained nurses, opened the Deseret Hospital, operated cooperative stores, promoted silk manufacture, saved wheat, and built granaries. In 1872, Snow provided assistance and advice to Louisa L. Greene in the creation of a woman's publication loosely affiliated with the Relief Society—the Woman's Exponent. Snow's responsibilities also extended to young women and children within the church. She was a primary organizer for the Young Ladies' Mutual Improvement Association in 1870 and assisted Aurelia Spencer Rogers in establishing the Primary Association in 1878.

Snow served as president of the Relief Society until her death in 1887. By 1888, the Relief Society had more than 22,000 members in 400 local congregations.

Snow died in Salt Lake City, and was buried in Brigham Young's family cemetery.

Poetry 
Snow wrote poetry from a young age, one time even writing school lessons in rhyme. Between 1826 and 1832, she published more than 20 poems in local newspapers under various pen names, including the Western Courier of Ravenna, Ohio, and the Ohio Star. Her first published poem was a requiem she was requested to write for John Adams and Thomas Jefferson, in light of their simultaneous deaths July 4, 1826. A number of Snow's poems were set to music and have become important Mormon hymns, some of which appear in the current edition of the Church of Jesus Christ’s hymnal. One of her hymns, "Great is the Lord", was published in the first Latter Day Saint hymnal in 1835, the year of her baptism.

In Nauvoo, Snow gained unique distinction as a Mormon poet featured in local newspapers, and she was later called "Zion's Poetess." She continued to write poems as she journeyed to the Salt Lake Valley, documenting the pioneer trail and life in Utah. The first of her two volumes of Poems, Religious, Historical, and Political appeared in 1856, followed by the second in 1877. Some of her poems are:
 "How Great the Wisdom and the Love"
 "Invocation, or the Eternal Father and Mother" [retitled "O My Father"]
 "Be Not Discouraged"
 "My First View of a Western Prairie"
 "Mental Gas"
 "Think not When You Gather to Zion Your Troubles and Trials are Through"
 "O Awake! My Slumbering Minstrel"

One of her best-known poems, "Invocation, or the Eternal Father and Mother," was written soon after the death of her father and just over a year after the death of Joseph Smith. The poem, renamed "O My Father" after the first line, is included in the current LDS Church's hymnal, as are Snow's hymns "Great is the Lord"; "Again We Meet Around the Board"; "Awake, Ye Saints of God, Awake!"; "How Great the Wisdom and the Love"; "The Time Is Far Spent"; "In Our Lovely Deseret"; "Though Deepening Trials"; "Behold the Great Redeemer Die"; and "Truth Reflects Upon Our Senses".

Publications

Relief Society Magazine

Articles

Poetry

Posthumous publications

See also

 Eliza R. Snow Performing Arts Center
 LDS fiction
 Mormon feminism
 Statue of Eliza R. Snow

References

Bibliography

Further reading 

 Karen Lynn Davidson, Jill Mulvay Derr, Eliza R. Snow: The Complete Poetry, (Brigham Young University Press, 2018)
 
 Palmer, Spencer J., Editor.  "Eliza R. Snow's 'Sketch of my Life': Reminiscences of One of Joseph Smith's Plural Wives." BYU Studies 12 (Autumn 1971).

External links

Eliza R. Snow at Joseph Fielding Smith Institute
Biography at The Joseph Smith Papers Project.
Eliza R. Snow letters, Brigham Young University, Harold B. Lee Library, L. Tom Perry Special Collections

1804 births
1887 deaths
19th-century American poets
19th-century American women writers
American Latter Day Saint hymnwriters
American Latter Day Saint writers
American leaders of the Church of Jesus Christ of Latter-day Saints
American lyricists
American women hymnwriters
American women non-fiction writers
American women poets
Burials at the Mormon Pioneer Memorial Monument
Converts to Mormonism from Restoration Movement denominations
General Presidents of the Relief Society
Latter Day Saint poets
Latter Day Saints from Illinois
Latter Day Saints from Missouri
Latter Day Saints from Ohio
Latter Day Saints from Utah
Mormon pioneers
People from Becket, Massachusetts
People from Portage County, Ohio
Poets from Massachusetts
Poets from Ohio
Poets from Utah
Richards–Young family
Wives of Brigham Young
Wives of Joseph Smith
19th-century American women musicians